The Ambassador of the Republic of the Philippines to Singapore is the Republic of the Philippines' foremost diplomatic representative in the Republic of Singapore. As head of the Philippines' diplomatic mission there, the Ambassador is the official representative of the President and the Government of the Philippines to the President and Government of Singapore. The position has the rank and status of an Ambassador Extraordinary and Plenipotentiary.

List of representatives

See also 
 Philippines–Singapore relations

Notes and References

External links
 

Philippines–Singapore relations
Singapore
Philippines